Loui William Eriksson (born 17 July 1985) is a Swedish professional ice hockey forward currently playing for Frölunda HC of the Swedish Hockey League (SHL). 

Eriksson was selected by the Dallas Stars in the second round, 33rd overall, at the 2003 NHL Entry Draft, and has also played for the Boston Bruins, Vancouver Canucks, and Arizona Coyotes of the National Hockey League (NHL).

Playing career
Eriksson started playing for Lerums BK at a young age and excelled beyond others his age quickly. By age 11, he was already playing with the older under-16 team. His talent was recognized by coach Joshua Clemas, at various tournaments, and he finally landed on the junior team for Frölunda HC.

Eriksson's professional career began in the top-tier Elitserien, where he played for Frölunda, sometimes facing his future fellow Boston Bruins forward Carl Söderberg when playing against the Malmö Redhawks during his first two seasons with Frölunda. Eriksson won Rookie of the Year honours in 2004 at the age of 18 after posting eight goals and five assists in 46 games. A year later, Eriksson would post five goals and nine assists in 39 games, helping Frölunda win the Swedish ice hockey championship (SM-guld).

Dallas Stars 

In the 2003 NHL Entry Draft, the Dallas Stars drafted Eriksson in the second round with the 33rd overall pick. After playing in his second season with Frölunda, Eriksson moved to North America and appeared in two pre-season games for Dallas in 2005. His professional debut in North America came on 6 October 2005, with the Stars' American Hockey League (AHL) affiliate, the Iowa Stars, in a game where Eriksson posted his first assist and point of the season.

Eriksson's first NHL goal came in his debut, 4 October 2006, against the Colorado Avalanche. Two years later, he had a break-out season in 2008–09, where he led the Stars with 36 goals, placing him fifth in the West and 12th overall in goal-scoring. He was one of only three Stars to play in all 82 games of the season. Prior to the following season, on 2 October 2009, he was recognized as a significant offensive force of the Stars attack by re-signing to a six-year contract extension worth $25.5 million.

Eriksson participated in his first NHL All-Star Game in 2011. He had a goal and two assists as well as the eventual game-winning empty-net goal to lead all players with four points (matched only by Shea Weber with four assists).

Boston Bruins

On 4 July 2013, Eriksson, along with prospects Joseph Morrow, Reilly Smith and Matt Fraser, was traded by the Stars to the Boston Bruins in exchange for Tyler Seguin, Rich Peverley and Ryan Button. In an injury-marred first season in Boston, after two concussions on separate hits from John Scott of the Buffalo Sabres and Brooks Orpik of the Pittsburgh Penguins, Eriksson would finish the 2013–14 season with 10 goals and 27 assists for 37 points in 61 games, finding chemistry with centre and fellow Swede Carl Söderberg.

During the 2015–16 season, on 13 February 2016, Eriksson scored his 200th NHL goal, as the third Bruins goal going towards a 4–2 road win against the Minnesota Wild.

Vancouver Canucks
On 1 July 2016, Eriksson signed a six-year, $36 million deal with the Vancouver Canucks. Eriksson previously had success with Henrik and Daniel Sedin in international tournaments. He made his Canucks debut on 15 October 2016, against the Calgary Flames where he scored an own goal. With the Vancouver net empty due to a delayed penalty by the Flames and facing pressure from attacking players, Eriksson attempted to dump the puck into his own zone, however, a miscalculation in the heat of the moment lead to the puck entering the Canuck's net. Nevertheless, Vancouver would win 2–1 in the shootout, with Eriksson earning an assist on the game-tying goal. On 5 March 2017 Eriksson suffered a season-ending knee injury after a collision with Anaheim Ducks forward Chris Wagner. Eriksson ended a disappointing first season with the Canucks with 11 goals and 13 assists in 65 games. Eriksson would have another dismal and injury plagued season with the Canucks in 2017-18 finishing with 23 points in 50 games. During the 2018-19 NHL season, Eriksson was able to stay healthy, but only scored 29 points in 81 games. On 10 February 2021, Eriksson was placed on waivers.

Arizona Coyotes
On 23 July 2021, Eriksson was traded, along with Jay Beagle, Antoine Roussel, a 2021 first-round pick, a 2022 second-round pick and a 2023 seventh-round pick, to the Arizona Coyotes in exchange for Oliver Ekman-Larsson and Conor Garland.

On December 6, 2021, Eriksson played his 1000th NHL game.

Return to Frölunda
After going unsigned through the NHL offseason, Eriksson re-signed with Frölunda on November 10, 2022, marking his return to the SHL after 17 years in North America.

Career statistics

Regular season and playoffs

International

Achievements
Won SHL Rookie of the Year in 2003–04
Won SHL league championship in 2005
RBK AHL Rookie of the Month for March 2006
Voted the Iowa Stars' Rookie of the Year for the 2005–06 season
2011 NHL All-Star
2012-2013, 2015–2016, Lady Byng Trophy Finalist

References

External links
 

1985 births
Living people
Arizona Coyotes players
Bofors IK players
Boston Bruins players
Dallas Stars draft picks
Dallas Stars players
Swedish expatriate ice hockey players in Canada
Swedish expatriate ice hockey players in the United States
Frölunda HC players
Ice hockey players at the 2010 Winter Olympics
Ice hockey players at the 2014 Winter Olympics
Iowa Stars players
Medalists at the 2014 Winter Olympics
National Hockey League All-Stars
Olympic ice hockey players of Sweden
Olympic medalists in ice hockey
Olympic silver medalists for Sweden
Ice hockey people from Gothenburg
Swedish ice hockey forwards
Vancouver Canucks players